Jeff Hyslop (born May 30, 1951) is a Canadian actor, singer, dancer, choreographer, and director.  Many of his roles have been in musical theatre. His most famous roles were as Jeff the mannequin in the children's show Today's Special and as the title role in the Canadian travelling production of The Phantom of the Opera.

Hyslop was born in Vancouver, British Columbia. He was married to Vancouver-born singer and actress Ruth Nichol. They have one daughter, Gemma Nichol Hyslop, born in 1976.

Selected filmography
The Magic of Aladdin (1989)
Once Upon a Giant (1988) - Prince Daryl
The Wars (1983) - Clifford Purchas
Today's Special (1981-1987) - Jeff
Dancin' Man (1980) - Self
Jesus Christ Superstar (1973) - Philip
Jack and the Beanstalk
Oompahpah

Stage work
A Chorus Line
Aladdin
A Little Show
Anne of Green Gables
Bye Bye Birdie
Cabaret
Dames at Sea
The Fantasticks
Godspell
Hamlet
Jack and the Beanstalk
Jacques Brel is Alive and Well and Living in Paris
Jane Eyre
Larry's Party
Histoire du Soldat
Love's Labour's Lost
The Music Man
Kiss of the Spider Woman
The Phantom of the Opera (title role)
Pippin
The Pirates of Penzance
The Producers
The Wizard of Oz

One-man shows
Jeff Hyslop: Feet First
Jeff Hyslop Now!

Directed/choreographed works
A Little Show
Babies: Bless Them All
The Club
Company
Dancin' Man
Guys and Dolls
Godspell
Good Boys and True
Irma la Douce
Jacob Two-Two
Jeff Hyslop: Feet First
Jeff Hyslop Now!
Joseph and the Amazing Technicolor Dreamcoat
McCartney TV special
Modern Housewives
On Tap
Peter Pan
Side by Side by Sondheim
Six Women With Brain Death
Take Two
They're Playing Our Song
Today's Special

References

External links
 

Canadian male musical theatre actors
Canadian male television actors
Male actors from Vancouver
1951 births
Living people
Canadian male dancers
20th-century Canadian male actors
20th-century Canadian dancers
21st-century Canadian male actors
21st-century Canadian dancers